The 1963 Stanley Cup Finals was the championship series of the National Hockey League's (NHL) 1962–63 season, and the culmination of the 1963 Stanley Cup playoffs. It was contested by the defending champion Toronto Maple Leafs and the Detroit Red Wings. The Maple Leafs won the best-of-seven series, four games to one, to win the Stanley Cup, their second straight NHL championship.

Paths to the Finals
Toronto defeated the Montreal Canadiens 4–1 to advance to the finals and Detroit defeated the Chicago Black Hawks 4–2

Game summaries
Johnny Bower limited the Wings to 10 goals in the five games, and five different Leafs had multiple-goal games: Duff, Nevin, Stewart, Kelly and Keon.

The Leafs had finished first in the regular season, and were installed as 13–5 favourites by oddsmakers.

Game one
In the first 68 seconds, Dick Duff scored twice on Detroit's Terry Sawchuk, the fastest two goals to start a game in Stanley Cup history. The Leafs would suffer a second-period letdown but would win 4–2 to take the lead in the series. Because of the second period letdown, Punch Imlach would put the team through a morning practice the next morning.

Game two
The Leafs would again win 4–2 and would again have to have a morning after workout assigned by Imlach.

Game three
The series now moved to Detroit. The team was sequestered out of town in a Toledo, Ohio hotel. The Red Wings, led by rookie centre Alex Faulkner's two goals, including the winner, captured the game three–2. It was his third game-winning goal and all had been scored on Sundays. Faulkner was a native of Newfoundland and Howie Meeker, exclaimed that there would be "dancing in the streets tonight".

Game four
The Leafs felt that they had let game three slip away due to overconfidence and were determined to not repeat the mistake in game four. The game was close, and was tied 2–2 until with ten minutes to go Dave Keon scored. Red Kelly added another to make the score 4–2.
On the way to the dressing room the Leafs' players were pelted with paper cups, programs and food containers.

Game five
Back in Toronto, the Red Wings kept the score close. After Keon scored a short-handed goal, Marcel Pronovost scored for Detroit to tie the game. The game and series winner was scored by Eddie Shack with seven minutes to go on a deflection. Shack had scored the goal unintentionally as he later admitted. Keon then scored another short-handed goal to put the game out of reach for Detroit.

The Leafs celebrated their second consecutive Stanley Cup by throwing Imlach, Harold Ballard and Stafford Smythe into the showers fully clothed. The team was given a victory parade along Bay Street with a reception at Toronto City Hall.

As of 2019, this is the only one of the last seven big four championship series involving a Toronto team (all of which have been won by Toronto) which did not last exactly six games.

Stanley Cup engraving
The 1963 Stanley Cup was presented to Maple Leafs captain George Armstrong by NHL President Clarence Campbell following the Maple Leafs 3–1 win over the Red Wings in game five.

The following Maple Leafs players and staff had their names engraved on the Stanley Cup

1962–63 Toronto Maple Leafs

See also
 1962–63 NHL season

Notes

References
 
 
 
 

Stanley Cup
Stanley Cup Finals
Detroit Red Wings games
Toronto Maple Leafs games
April 1963 sports events in Canada
1963 in Toronto
Ice hockey competitions in Detroit
Ice hockey competitions in Toronto
1963 in Detroit
Stanley Cup